The Paul Lynde Show is an American television sitcom that aired on ABC. The series starred comedian Paul Lynde and aired for one season, with original episodes airing from September 13, 1972, to March 14, 1973.

Setting
The series starred Lynde as Paul Simms, a general-practice attorney and the father of a family that consisted of his wife Martha (Elizabeth Allen) and daughters Barbara (Jane Actman) and Sally (Pamelyn Ferdin). The Simms family lived in the fictional city of Ocean Grove, California.

It also starred John Calvin as Barbara's husband, Howie Dickerson, an eccentric university student who was of genius intelligence (IQ 185) and was a whiz with everything and full of advice, but inexplicably, he could not manage to hold down a job, and Jerry Stiller and Anne Meara as Howie's divorced parents, Barney and Grace Dickerson. Howie's misadventures around the house and his lack of steady employment brought his father-in-law to a state of slow-burn anger and drove him to distraction.

Critics perceived the show as derivative of All in the Family, then television's most popular primetime program, and the Paul Simms role bore similarities to Lynde's best-known film role, that of Harry MacAfee from the film and musical Bye Bye Birdie. For his role in the series, Lynde was nominated for a Best Actor Golden Globe.

Cast
 Paul Lynde as Paul Simms
 Elizabeth Allen as Martha Simms
 John Calvin as Howie Dickerson
 Jane Actman as Barbara Simms Dickerson
 Pamelyn Ferdin as Sally Simms
 James Gregory as T.R. Scott
 Anne Meara as Grace Dickerson
 Allison McKay as Alice
 Jerry Stiller as Barney Dickerson
 Herb Voland as T.J. McNish
 Thelma Carpenter as Thelma
 Mabel Albertson as Mabel
 Charlotte Rae as Aunt Charlotte

Production
The show was based on the play Howie, about a lawyer, played by Lynde, whose daughter marries a slacker named Howard, or "Howie".  The Lynde character despises him as he is not interested in earning money or traditional pursuits. Howie was developed for CBS in 1962, as a replacement for The Dick Van Dyke Show, but when that series was saved from cancellation, plans for Howie were shelved.

William Asher later resurrected the Howie concept for ABC and Screen Gems as a replacement for Bewitched. Asher and then-wife Elizabeth Montgomery were contractually obligated for two more seasons of Bewitched for ABC. Montgomery was not interested in continuing the series (she and Asher were also on the verge of divorcing), and Lynde was also under contract to ABC. The Paul Lynde Show (along with the first incarnation of Temperatures Rising) was created to fulfill the contracts. Lynde had appeared numerous times on Bewitched as "Uncle Arthur". Asher designed The Paul Lynde Show to be ABC's counterpart to CBS's All In The Family; however, the show lacked the controversial and topical issues brought up by All In The Family, due to ABC's continued restriction on social issues at the time. This was despite Lynde's rewrite of the show's dialog in an effort to make the series more lively and comedic.

The show was filmed before a live audience, with a laugh track added during post-production 
for "sweetening" purposes. Unusual for such a series, the production included a frequently seen backyard set with a fully functional swimming pool, which Lynde would occasionally fall into.

The next season, ABC would cast Lynde as the lead on the re-tooled Temperatures Rising over Asher's objections. That series lasted until 1974. ABC would burn off Lynde's contract by placing him in variety shows such as The Paul Lynde Halloween Special, 'Twas the Night Before Christmas and Donny & Marie.

Reception
Scheduled opposite the first half of the Top 30 hit The Carol Burnett Show on CBS and the Top 20 hit Adam-12 on NBC, the first episode proved to be a major hit; strong negative reactions led to bad word of mouth and a resulting collapse in ratings. The show was canceled after a single 26-episode season.

Episodes

References

External links

 
 

1972 American television series debuts
1973 American television series endings
1970s American sitcoms
American Broadcasting Company original programming
English-language television shows
Television series about families
Television series based on plays
Television series by Screen Gems
Television shows set in California